Jinnah: India-Partition-Independence is a book written by Jaswant Singh, a former Finance Minister of India and an External Affairs Minister, on Pakistan's founder Quaid-e-Azam Muhammad Ali Jinnah and the politics associated with the Partition of India. It is currently the latest book written by an Indian politician on the life of Jinnah. 
The book was released on 17 August 2009 and soon became the subject of controversy, subsequently leading to Singh's expulsion from the Bhartiya Janata Party (BJP). It contains controversial opinions of Singh, claiming that Pandit Jawaharlal Nehru's centralised policy was responsible for partition, and that Jinnah was portrayed as a demon by India for the partition. The book launch ceremony was held at Teen Murti Bhavan in the presence of only a couple of BJP members.

Response
Singh was expelled by the BJP following a party meeting chaired by L.K. Advani on 19 August 2009 stating that they will not "compromise on matters of ideology or discipline". The government of the Indian state Gujarat banned the book for allegedly having defamatory references towards India's first home minister Vallabhbhai Patel. However, Gujarat lifted the ban on 4th September 2009 after a court struck it down. The Indian newspaper The Hindu claimed "Mark Tully, Meghnad Desai, Ram Jethmalani, Natwar Singh and Hameed Haroon said a new appraisal of Jinnah’s role was needed and Mr. Singh had done a commendable job."  
In response to the book, Nusli Wadia, the grandson of Jinnah said: "My grandfather is my grandfather. You can't change the fact that I am his [Jinnah's] grandson, and I take extreme pride on being that."

Other publications on Jinnah
A collection of Jinnah's writing and speeches, titled Muhammad Jinnah: An Ambassador of Unity, was published by the Indian politician and poet Sarojini Naidu in 1919. It included a short biography of Jinnah, written by Naidu, as well as a foreword by Mohammad Ali Mohammad Khan.

References

External links 
 
 Jinnah: India-Partition-Independence 

Indian non-fiction books
2009 non-fiction books
Books about Muhammad Ali Jinnah
Political books
Books about politics of Pakistan
Books about politics of India
Books about British India
Books about international relations
Books about foreign relations of the United Kingdom
History books about Pakistan
Rupa Publications books
21st-century Indian books
Censored books
Jaswant Singh